Fearsome Foursome may refer to:

 Fearsome Foursome (comics), a Marvel comic book group
 Fearsome Foursome (American football), title given to dominating defensive lines in American football